Germaria ruficeps is a species of tachinid flies in the genus Germaria of the family Tachinidae.

Distribution
Belgium, United Kingdom, France,  Denmark, Sweden, Hungary, Russia, Mongolia, Israel.

References

Diptera of Europe
Diptera of Asia
Tachininae
Insects described in 1820
Taxa named by Carl Fredrik Fallén